Spycker is a commune in the Nord department in northern France.

History
Spycker was liberated by soldiers of The Black Watch (Royal Highland Regiment) of Canada in September 1944.

Heraldry

See also
Communes of the Nord department

References

Communes of Nord (French department)
French Flanders